Woodrow Wilson Junior High School may refer to:

 Woodrow Wilson Junior High School (Terre Haute, Indiana), listed on the NRHP in Indiana
 Woodrow Wilson Junior High School (Eugene, Oregon), listed on the NRHP in Oregon
 Woodrow Wilson Junior High School (Philadelphia, Pennsylvania), listed on the NRHP in Pennsylvania

See also
Wilson School (disambiguation)
Wilson High School (disambiguation)
Woodrow Wilson High School (disambiguation)